Curierul Românesc was a Romanian-language newspaper published in Bucharest in 1829. It was the first newspaper in the language.

References

Newspapers established in 1829
Romanian-language newspapers
Newspapers published in Romania
1829 establishments in Romania